A tax return is the completion of documentation that calculates an entity or individual's income earned and the amount of taxes to be paid to the government or government organizations or, potentially, back to the taxpayer.

Taxation is one of the biggest sources of income for the government. There are two types of taxes—direct and indirect—which are both parts of the tax revenue. Tax revenue is the income gained by government from taxes that are levied on income, profit, goods and services, land revenue, ownership, and transfer of property, and other taxes. Total tax revenue calculated as a percentage of GDP shows the share of the country’s output collected by the government through taxes. Tax revenue is used by governments to grant sums of money to communities, the military, education, hospitals, and infrastructure. 

In the United States the Internal Revenue Service (IRS) administers federal tax laws. It is a government entity that fulfils three main functions. Firstly, it processes tax returns. Secondly, it provides services for taxpayers. Thirdly, it enforces the tax laws enacted by Congress. Furthermore, IRS also investigates financial crimes and oversees tax-exempt organizations.

Citizens in Sweden, Denmark, Finland, and Iceland pay the highest taxes and also get the highest benefits from taxes such as free or low-cost healthcare, education, childcare, etc. Austria, the Netherlands, and Belgium also have high taxes. In contrast, countries such as Saudi Arabia, Brunei, Monaco, the Cayman Islands, Bahamas, and Andorra are so-called tax havens. These countries only tax very specific types of wealth or income, have very low tax rates in general, or have no taxes at all.

Tax Schedule 
In the United States, a tax schedule is a form required by the Internal Revenue Service (IRS) to be prepared in addition to the tax return. It is a tool that reports and provides information about the additional calculations and other amounts stated in the tax return. These generally include information on amounts such as mortgage interest, interest income or charitable contributions.

Tax schedules are used by both taxpayers and taxation authorities such as IRS. The simple tax returns can be filed using the Form 1040 whereas the complex tax returns additionally requires a tax schedule to be completed with the tax returns. There are different types of schedules  such as Schedule A, Schedule B, Schedule C, Schedule D , Schedule EIC and Schedule SE. Specific tax forms can be used by taxpayers or private entities that are required to report information on the tax liabilities, including income earners, businesses, and companies.

Filling in the tax return 
A person may have to fill in a tax return depending on circumstances, which are different in each country. Generally, a tax return does not need to be filed if an income does not exceed a certain amount of money, but other factors such as the type of income, age, and filing status also play a role. Occasionally, there may be situations where a person does not have to fill in the tax return, but will do so anyway to receive a tax refund from the state.

A tax return is different from a tax refund. A tax refund will occur when an individual has paid money to the state exceeding the level of expected income tax. In contrast, a tax return is a form a person needs to fill in every year to report income, expenses, and other relevant information. A tax return, therefore, helps a person to deal with tax calculations and payments or understand if a tax refund is due. This will depend on whether a person has overpaid on taxes, or were late in paying previous tax returns.

The difficulty of filling in a tax return varies from country to country, but governments try to help citizens in different ways. Many governments utilize electronic filling and payment systems that keep a record of a person's history of tax returns and refunds. Another notable change in recent years is that government bodies share the data with each other. Within several European nations such as Denmark and Sweden, governments already provide citizens with prefilled return forms, which a citizen would sign if accurate, and if not, can fix the error on their own or prepare returns themselves. In Denmark and Sweden, 97% and 74% of taxpayers had their forms prefilled by tax authorities respectively in 1999.  

The length of the completion of a tax return depends on the country, but the world average is almost 232 hours.

Constituents of a tax return
In many countries, the three parts of a tax return usually include the following parts:

Income: This part consists of all the sources of a citizen's revenue. In the United States, the most widely known method for detailing is a form W-2, obtained from an employer. Wages, salaries, dividends, and interest should likewise be considered as a source of revenue.  It essentially measures the gross income which is divided into five subparts as per income tax laws: Income from Salary, Income from House Property, Profits and Gains from Business Profession, Income from Capital Gains, Income from Other Sources. 

Deductions: Reasoning or deductions form taxable income that reduces tax liability. For organizations, most expenses specifically identified with business tasks are deductible. Examples of tax deductions include mortgage interests, student loan interest, contributions to saving plans for retirement etc. The taxpayers can either itemize their deductions or use the standard deduction depending on which deduction on taxable income is greater. 

Taxpayers can use standard deductions which varies according to filing status, for example, for older taxpayers (65 and above), the standard deduction is higher. It can be filed using Form 1040 or Form 1040-SR. In case of itemized deductions, the receipts for items to be filed under it must be preserved and divided into categories. At tax time, the expenses are recorded on Schedule A and the audited receipts are held back.

Tax credits: Tax Credits are incentives for taxpayers that reduce the amount of liability paid to government entities. Tax credits are more impactful than deductions because they directly reduce the amount of money owed. If a person has $500 in tax credits, and the tax owed is $500, the tax credits will reduce a person's liability to zero. Tax credits arise from multiple areas. For example, a person may receive a Child Tax Credit if they care for a child under the age of 13. Education expenses might be treated as a tax credit in some countries, such as the American Opportunity Tax Credit in the United States. The AOTC can cover up to four years of a full time student in a post secondary school. Depending on your income, you can earn up to $2,500 of the cost of qualified tuition and course material paid during the tax year.

See also
 IRS tax forms
 Tax information reporting
 Tax return (Australia)
 Tax return (Canada)
 Income tax return (India)
 Tax return (United Kingdom)
 Tax return (United States)
 Tax evasion

References